N0iz Star (typeset often as n0iZ stAr) is the first full-length album by Sug, released May 14, 2008. It includes 11 tracks, a DVD with the music video for "Vi-Vi-Vi" and a forty-page booklet.

Track listing
Disk one (CD)
Chocoholic N0iz - 1:08
B.R.K - 3:36
Kokuu (虚空) - 4:15
Vi-Vi-Vi - 4:48
Yami Tsuki Delay (ヤミツキディレイ) - 4:14
Shikisai (四季彩) - 5:09
Romantic - 4:22
Seiyokuholic (生欲Holic) - 3:29
Crimson soda - 3:42
Uesto Faaito Sto~ri~ (うえすとふぁいとすと～り～) - 3:54
PikaLife - 3:20

Disk two (DVD)
"Vi-Vi-Vi" - 5:16

Sug albums
2008 albums